Ethan Donald Wragge (born October 1, 1990) is an American former basketball player who last played for the Gießen 46ers of Germany's Basketball Bundesliga.  Wragge played college basketball at Creighton University.

Wragge, a 6'7" small forward from Eden Prairie, Minnesota, played for Creighton from 2009 to 2014.  For most of his time there he played with All-American Doug McDermott.  As a senior, Wragge was one of the top three-point shooters in the NCAA, finishing the season at 47% from three, good for fifth in the country.

Following his graduation from Creighton, Wragge went undrafted in the 2014 NBA draft.  He signed with Bilbao Basket in Spain's top league. After spending one season with them, he signed with the Giessen 46ers in Germany's Basketball Bundesliga.

See also
 List of NCAA Division I men's basketball players with 145 games played

References

External links
Spanish League profile
Creighton Bluejays bio

1990 births
Living people
American expatriate basketball people in Germany
American expatriate basketball people in Spain
American men's basketball players
Basketball players from Minnesota
Basketball players from Ohio
Bilbao Basket players
Creighton Bluejays men's basketball players
Giessen 46ers players
Liga ACB players
People from Eden Prairie, Minnesota
Sportspeople from Sandusky, Ohio
Small forwards